Plumtree is a town in Zimbabwe. Alongside marula trees, wild plum trees (Ntungulu in tjiKalanga) grow abundantly in area. The town was once called Getjenge by baKalanga. Another name which is mainly used is Titji, meaning station and referring to the railway station which was operating in the area around 1897.

Location
The town is located in Bulilimamangwe District, in the Matabeleland South Province, in southwestern Zimbabwe, at the international border with Botswana. The geographical coordinates of Plumtree are:
20°28'41.0"S, 27°47'50.0"E (Latitude:-20.478056; Longitude:27.797222). The border is defined by the Ramokgwebana River. The village of Ramokgwebana is opposite Plumtree on the Botswana side.

Overview
It is the local administrative centre for Mangwe District, which is made up of two sub-districts; namely (a) Mangwe Urban (Plumtree) and (b) Mangwe Rural. What was Bulilima West, is now Bulilima District. (see:Map of the Districts of Matabeleland South Provinve)

The Tati River rises near Plumtree, running west and then south into the Shashe River, a tributary of the Limpopo.

The railway from Bulawayo to Francistown crosses the border near Plumtree. There is a functioning casino in Plumtree. There are several elementary and secondary schools in the town. Radio and television reception from within Zimbabwe is weak in this neighborhood. Residents in Plumtree and neighboring communities rely on reception from neighboring Botswana and South Africa for news and general information.

Population
There are two main languages spoken in Plumtree; (a) tjiKalanga and (b) isiNdebele. Other languages spoken to a lesser extent include seTswana, used near the Botswana border. In 2004, the population of the town was estimated at 2,184. The 2012 national population census enumerated the population of Plumtree, Zimbabwe, at 11,660 inhabitants. Of these, 6,261 (53.7 percent) were females and 5,399 (46.3 percent) were males. They were grouped into 3,273 households with average size of 3.6 family members.

Climate

Notable people linked to Plumtree
 Alfred Taylor

See also
 Kalanga people
 Economy of Zimbabwe
 Districts of Zimbabwe
 Provinces of Zimbabwe

References

External links
 Plumtree Development Trust As of December 2017.

Populated places in Matabeleland South Province
Mangwe District
Botswana–Zimbabwe border crossings